'Çağbaşı is a village in Tarsus  district of Mersin Province, Turkey. It is situated in Çukurova (Cilicia of the antiquity) to the southeast of Tarsus. The population of Çağbaşı is 756 as of 2011. The village is situated in the fertile area and the main products are grapes and cotton.

References

Villages in Tarsus District